Ferenc Molnár (1878–1952) was a Hungarian dramatist and novelist.

Ferenc Molnár may also refer to:
 Ferenc Molnár (athlete) (1904–?), Hungarian Olympic athlete
 Ferenc Molnár (footballer) (1891–?), football player and later manager in Italy
 Ferenc Molnár (singer) (born 1982), known professionally as Caramel, winner of the second series of Megasztár
 Ferenc Zoltán Molnár (1943–1967), U.S. Army soldier and Medal of Honor recipient